Benign paroxysmal vertigo of childhood is an uncommon neurological disorder which presents with recurrent episodes of dizziness. The presentation is usually between the ages of 2 years and 7 years of age and is characterised by short episodes of vertigo of sudden onset when the child appears distressed and unwell. The child may cling to something or someone for support. The episode lasts only minutes and resolves suddenly and completely. It is a self-limiting condition and usually resolves after about eighteen months, although many go on to experience migrainous vertigo (or vestibular migraine) when older.

Benign paroxysmal vertigo of childhood is a migrainous phenomenon with more than 50% of those affected having a family history of migraines affecting a first-degree relative. It has no relationship to benign paroxysmal positional vertigo which is a different condition entirely.

References 

Ailments of unknown cause
Pediatrics